Russell Dominic Peters (born September 29, 1970) is a Canadian stand-up comedian, actor, and producer. He began performing in Toronto in 1989 and won a Gemini Award in 2008. In 2013, he was number three on Forbes list of the world's highest-paid comedians, and became the first comedian to get a Netflix stand-up special. He also won the Peabody Award and the International Emmy Award for Best Arts Programming for producing Hip-Hop Evolution (2016). He lives in Los Angeles.

Early life
Peters was born in Toronto, Ontario, Canada on September 29, 1970 to immigrants from India, both of Anglo-Indian descent, Eric and Maureen Peters, who had moved to Canada in 1965 from Bombay, Maharashtra, Western India and Calcutta, West Bengal, East India respectively. His extended family lives in Burhanpur, Madhya Pradesh.    

Peters was raised Catholic.

When Peters was four, he and his family moved to Brampton. He attended Chinguacousy Secondary School for grades 9–10, and North Peel Secondary School in Bramalea for grades 11–12. In school, he was regularly bullied because of his ethnicity. He eventually learned boxing, which helped him resist the bullying. Peters also became a fan of hip hop in his youth. By the 1990s, he was a well-connected DJ in the Toronto scene.

Peters's older brother, Clayton, serves as his manager.

Career 
Peters began performing in Toronto in 1989. He has since gone on to perform in several countries.

In 1992, Peters met American comedian George Carlin, one of his biggest influencers, who advised him to get on stage whenever and wherever possible. Peters said he "took that advice to heart, and I think that's the reason I am where I am now." In 2007, 15 years later, he hosted one of Carlin's last shows before the comedian's death the following year.

On September 28, 2013, Peters was awarded the 2013 Trailblazer award by the Association of South Asians in Media, Marketing and Entertainment (ASAMME) for good contributions to comedy. He is among the first South Asians to achieve international success in the field.

In 2017, Peters made an appearance on Top Gear America in the third episode of season 1 as one of the guests.

According to Forbes, Peters earned an estimated $15 million between June 2009 and June 2010, continuing his run as one of the highest-paid comedians, after earning an estimated $5 million the prior year. Forbes ranked him as the seventh-highest-paid comedian. In 2013, he earned $21 million, according to Forbes estimate.

Notable performances

Comedy Now! special 
Peters credits the turning point in his career to his 2004 special on the Canadian TV show Comedy Now!, which was uploaded onto YouTube, where it became popular. While the initial video upload featured his entire 45-minute performance, YouTube users subsequently uploaded segments of the performance in which Peters focused on individual cultural groups. According to Peters, those segments were seen by the targeted cultural groups and were well received by them. The video and its viral nature was referred to by Peters on his performance, Outsourced; when the audience cheered when he referred to earlier jokes, he exclaimed, "Look at you, you filthy downloaders!"

Others 
In 2007, Peters was the first comedian to sell out Toronto's Air Canada Centre, selling more than 16,000 tickets in two days for the single show. He ended up selling more than 30,000 tickets nationally over the two-day sales period. He broke a UK comedy sales record at London's O2 Arena when he sold over 16,000 tickets to his show in 2009. His show in Sydney on 15 May 2010 had an audience of 13,880, making it the largest stand-up comedy show ever in Australia. Peters's performances on 5–6 May 2012 in Singapore also set attendance records for a single stand-up comedian at the Singapore Indoor Stadium.

Peters hosted the Canada Day Comedy Festival 2006, and participated in a USO tour of Iraq, Afghanistan, Germany, Africa and Greenland in November 2007 with Wilmer Valderrama and Mayra Veronica. He also produced and starred in the radio situation comedy series Monsoon House on CBC Radio One.

Peters was the host of the televised 2008 Juno Awards ceremonies in Calgary on 6 April, 2008, for which he won a Gemini Award for "Best Performance or Host in a Variety Program or Series." The show received the second-highest ratings of any Juno Awards broadcast. Following the show's success, Peters accepted an invitation to host the Juno Awards for a second consecutive year; the 2009 Juno Awards took place in Vancouver on 29 March 2009.

DVDs and book 

Peters released his debut comedy album, Outsourced, of his performance aired on Comedy Central on August 26, 2006. The DVD version is uncensored; it has sold more than 100,000 copies, and remained on the National DVD Chart over one and a half years after its release.

Peters released a second DVD/CD combo, Red, White and Brown, in Canada in 2008, and in the U.S. in early 2009. It was recorded on February 2, 2008, at the WaMu Theatre in New York City's Madison Square Garden. It was self-produced and financed by Peters and his brother Clayton.

On October 26, 2010, Peters published his autobiography, Call Me Russell, co-written with his brother, Clayton, and Dannis Koromilas.

In May 2011, Peters released The Green Card Tour: Live from the O2 Arena, a live performance recorded in front of a total audience of 30,000, over two nights at O2 Arena in London, England. Also in 2011, Peters received a star on Canada's Walk of Fame.

Comedic style
Peters's stand-up performances feature observational comedy, using humour to highlight racial, ethnic, class and cultural stereotypes. He often refers to his own experiences growing up in an Anglo-Indian family, and impersonates the accents of various ethnic groups to poke fun at them. As he told an audience in San Francisco, "I don't make the stereotypes, I just see them." In a 2006 interview with The National, Peters observed that he did not intend to put down or offend different races and cultures, but tried to "raise them up through humour".

Peters is widely known for his punchline, "Somebody gonna get a hurt real bad." It ends a joke he tells about his childhood with a traditional Indian father, who used corporal punishment on his sons. Another punchline he uses is "Be a man! Do the right thing!", which relates to a story of a Chinese man trying to get him to pay more for an item at a shop.

Personal life
Peters lives in Los Angeles, California, and owns two homes there. He also owns homes in Las Vegas Valley, Nevada and Vaughan, Ontario.

It will be awarded annually to a student from Judith Nyman Secondary School (formerly North Peel) with a strong academic record and the intention of attending college.

Relationships 
Peters proposed to girlfriend Monica Diaz on July 10, 2010, at the Los Angeles International Airport and announced their engagement via Twitter. The couple married on August 20, 2010, at A Little White Wedding Chapel in Las Vegas, Nevada. The wedding was attended by about 20 guests, including an Elvis impersonator. Soon after, Peters told The Canadian Press that Diaz was pregnant, saying, "Did I get married because she was knocked up? I would say that expedited it." Their daughter, Crystianna Marie Peters, was born two months early on December 14, 2010. In a March 2012 interview, Peters revealed that he and Diaz were divorcing.

In October 2016, it was announced that Peters was engaged to Ruzanna Khetchian. After the engagement was called off, Peters announced on December 4, 2018, via Twitter, that he and his new girlfriend Jennifer Andrade were expecting a child. Andrade was the Miss Universe Honduras in 2012. The following April, it was announced that Andrade had given birth to a boy, whom they named Russell Santiago Peters. His relationship with Andrade ended in 2020.

On February 20, 2022, Peters married Ali Peters at the Ritz Carlton in Dana Point, California.

Religious beliefs 
When interviewer Larry King asked Peters, "Is there such a thing as too taboo?", Peters replied, "I don't talk about religion because I think people are a little weird about religion, especially nowadays, and I'm more of a science guy than I am a beliefs guy. I'm more into facts than I am into beliefs." Peters is an atheist.

Works 

Russell Peters has appeared in many films. Earlier in his career, he had cameo roles in Boozecan (1994) as Snake's Friend, Tiger Claws III (2000) as Detective Elliott, My Baby's Daddy (2004) as the obstetrician, and Quarter Life Crisis (2006) as Dilip Kumar.

He appeared in Senior Skip Day (2008), which starred Larry Miller, Tara Reid, and Gary Lundy. That year he was also in The Take (2008) as Dr. Sharma.

He acted in the Punjabi-Canadian Breakaway (2011), alongside  Rob Lowe, Camilla Belle, Anupam Kher, and Vinay Virmani. That year he also acted in Duncan Jones's Source Code (2011) as Max, an amateur comedian with a bad attitude; and as Pervius in National Lampoon's 301: The Legend of Awesomest Maximus (2011).

Peters has guest-starred on the TV series Mr. D as the school superintendent. In 2011, he starred in a Canadian TV Christmas special, A Russell Peters Christmas. Guests included Michael Bublé, Pamela Anderson, and Jon Lovitz. The show attracted the highest number of viewers of any CTV Canadian holiday special.

Filmography

Film

Television

Comedy specials

Bibliography 

 2010. Call Me Russell. Random House Digital, Inc. .

Awards and nominations

References

External links

 
 Official Russell Peters YouTube Channel
Russell named first Toronto ambassador

1970 births
Living people
20th-century Canadian comedians
20th-century Canadian male actors
21st-century Canadian comedians
21st-century Canadian male actors
Canadian atheists
Canadian Comedy Award winners
Canadian expatriate male actors in the United States
Canadian Internet celebrities
Canadian male actors of Indian descent
Canadian male comedians
Canadian male film actors
Canadian male radio actors
Canadian male television actors
Canadian male voice actors
Canadian people of Anglo-Indian descent
Canadian people of British descent
Canadian people of Indian descent
Anglo-Indian people
Canadian Screen Award winners
Canadian stand-up comedians
Comedians from Toronto
Former Roman Catholics
Male actors from Toronto
People from Brampton
Warner Records artists
Canadian YouTubers
Comedy-related YouTube channels